Roberta L. Shea (born c. 1967) is a United States Marine Corps officer who served as the Commanding General of the 1st Marine Logistics Group from July 2019 to April 2021.

Education and early career
Shea enlisted in the United States Marine Corps in January 1985. Trained as a ground support equipment mechanic, she served with 2nd Marine Aircraft Wing at Marine Corps Air Station Cherry Point, North Carolina. She was commissioned from the United States Naval Academy in 1991 and was assigned as a communications officer.

Shea's military education includes graduating as an honor graduate from both the Marine Corps Basic Communications Officers Course and the Amphibious Warfare School, and as the Commandant's Distinguished Graduate from the Industrial College of the Armed Forces, National Defense University. She has also earned a Master of Science in Computer Information Systems from Boston University in 2000 and a Master of Science in National Resource Strategy from the Industrial College of the Armed Forces in 2011.

Marine officer career
Shea's operational assignments have included: platoon commander and company commander with the 2nd Landing Support Battalion, 2nd Force Service Support Group; company commander with Marine Wing Communications Squadron 38, 3rd Marine Aircraft Wing; S-6 Officer for the 22nd Marine Expeditionary Unit for deployments to Afghanistan and Iraq; Director of the Commander's Initiatives Group for the Commander, International Security Assistance Force, Afghanistan; Assistant Chief of Staff G-6, 3d Marine Aircraft Wing; and Commanding Officer, I Marine Expeditionary Force Headquarters Group.

Shea has also served as a series commander, company commander, and battalion commander with 4th Recruit Training Battalion, as the Assistant Director of the Drill Instructor School, Marine Corps Recruit Depot Parris Island; as a White House Fellow and Special Assistant to the Homeland Security Advisor; as a Strategic Analyst with the Strategic Initiatives Group, Headquarters, Marine Corps; as the Director, Commandants Staff Group, Headquarters, Marine Corps; as the Deputy Commandant of Midshipmen, United States Naval Academy; and as Acting Deputy Assistant Secretary of Defense for East Asia.

Shea assumed duties as the Commanding General of the 1st Marine Logistics Group in July 2019. She was then appointed Legislative Assistant to the Commandant of the Marine Corps in April 2021 and, in December, was nominated for promotion to the rank of major general by President Joe Biden.

References

1960s births
Living people
Recipients of the Defense Superior Service Medal
Recipients of the Legion of Merit
Female generals of the United States Marine Corps
United States Marine Corps personnel of the Iraq War
United States Marine Corps personnel of the War in Afghanistan (2001–2021)